Apiaí is a Brazilian municipality of the state of São Paulo. The population is 24,226 (2020 est.) in an area of 974 km².

References

Municipalities in São Paulo (state)